Admiral DeWitt Clinton Ramsey (2 October 1888 – 7 September 1961) was a U.S. Navy officer and pioneer naval aviator who served as an aircraft carrier commander during World War II. His postwar assignments included command of the U.S. Pacific Fleet and service as Chief of the Bureau of Aeronautics (BuAer) in the Navy Department and as Vice Chief of Naval Operations.

Biography
Ramsey was born on October 2, 1888 at Whipple Barracks, near Prescott, Arizona, to Frank DeWitt Ramsey and Lillian Carlotta Zulick. He was the grandson of Arizona Territorial Governor C. Meyer Zulick. Upon graduation from the U.S. Naval Academy, Ramsey was commissioned an Ensign in June 1912. He took Juanita as his wife. In 1917 he qualified as a naval aviator. During World War I, he was Inspection Officer for United States Naval Air Stations in France, and a member of the Inter-Allied Naval Armistice Commission.

During the interwar period, Ramsey served as a naval aviator on various naval staffs and ships. Reporting on board the aircraft carrier  in 1938, he was her executive officer into 1939. Later that year, he headed BuAer's Plans Division, and in 1941 became Assistant Chief of BuAer.

During World War II, he commanded the Saratoga up to and during the landings against Guadalcanal, Solomon Islands, in August.

For his skillful use of airpower against Japanese naval forces in the Solomons, he was awarded the Navy Cross. In the Saratoga, he next commanded a task force that included a British carrier, HMS Victorious (R38).

Ramsey received the Navy Distinguished Service Medal as Chief of the U.S. Navy Bureau of Aeronautics (BuAer) from August 6, 1943, to June 1, 1945, and a Gold Star as Vice Chief of Naval Operations from January 15, 1946, to January 3, 1948.

After commanding the Pacific Fleet, he served as Commissioner of Trust Territory of the Pacific Islands, until retiring on 1 May 1949.

Admiral Ramsey died 7 September 1961, at Naval Hospital Philadelphia at the age of 72.

Navy Cross citation

References

External links

1888 births
1961 deaths
United States Navy personnel of World War I
United States Navy World War II admirals
United States Navy admirals
Battle of Midway
United States Naval Aviators
Recipients of the Navy Cross (United States)
Recipients of the Navy Distinguished Service Medal
Recipients of the Legion of Merit
United States Naval Academy alumni
People from Yavapai County, Arizona
Members of the Early Birds of Aviation
High Commissioners of the Trust Territory of the Pacific Islands
Vice Chiefs of Naval Operations